The Heinz Hopf Prize is awarded every two years at ETH Zurich. The prize honours outstanding scientific work in the field of pure mathematics. It is named after the German mathematician Heinz Hopf (1894–1971), Professor of Mathematics at ETH from 1931 to 1965. The prize amount of 30,000 Swiss Francs (approximately US$29,000, €20,000, or £18,200 ) is awarded on the occasion of the Heinz Hopf Lectures that are given at ETH by the laureate.

The prize was awarded for the first time in October 2009.

Laureates

See also
 List of mathematics awards

References

External links
 

Mathematics awards
Swiss awards
Awards established in 2008